Nicola Antonio Monti (August 16, 1736 - December 19, 1795) was an Italian painter of the Neoclassical style.

Biography
Born in Ascoli Piceno, he first trained locally under Biagio Miniera, then traveled to Rome to study under Pompeo Batoni. He was active in Ascoli, Perugia, Rome, and Fermo.  He painted for the Church of Santa Maria in Monterone, Rome. The Cathedral of Ascoli Piceno has a painting depicting the Miracle of Bread and Fishes (1782). He painted a St Anne, Virgin, and young St John the Baptist (1769) for the church of San Domenico in Ascoli. He died in poverty.

References

External links

1736 births
1795 deaths
People from the Province of Ascoli Piceno
18th-century Italian painters
Italian male painters
Rococo painters
18th-century Italian male artists